= Griffin Heights =

Neighborhood in Florida

Coordinates: 30.458°N 84.304°W

Griffin Heights is a neighborhood in northwestern Tallahassee, Florida. The area has had problems with gun violence and drugs. It is historically African American. It is home to apartments serving students from Florida State University. The area is also home to the New Birth Tabernacle of Praise church. Griffin Middle School is also located in the neighborhood. Griffin Heights and Greater Frenchtown were part of the City of Tallahassee's Greater Safety Initiative in 2018. In 2019, Rosalind Bentley, a writer for The Atlanta Journal-Constitution who is from Griffin Heights, wrote about white people moving into the area as Florida State University expands its footprint.
